The Brooklyn Hispano was an American soccer club based in Brooklyn, New York that was an inaugural member of the reformed American Soccer League. The club was named the Brooklyn Giants for the 1942/43 season only.

The Hispano club competed in the Southern New York State Football Association with several successful runs in their Cup competition during the 1920s. The club won the competition in 1927 and 1930 as the New York Hispano. N.Y. Hispano was a member of the professional Eastern Soccer League - a rival of the A.S.L. during the "soccer war" of 1929-1930.

After 7 games of the 1933/34 ASL season the team merged with Brooklyn F.C. The aggregation was renamed Brooklyn Hispano Football Club which began play on January 21, 1934 and assumed the record of Hispano F.C. in the standings.

The club took the "double" in 1943 winning the league and National Challenge Cup. The team won the Lewis Cup in 1946.

Year-by-year

References 

Men's soccer clubs in New York (state)
Defunct soccer clubs in New York City
American Soccer League (1933–1983) teams
Sports in Brooklyn
U.S. Open Cup winners